Coleus maculosus subsp. edulis, synonym Plectranthus edulis, the Ethiopian potato, known as welayta dinich in Amharic, is a species of perennial plant in the family Lamiaceae. It is indigenous to Ethiopia, where it is grown for its edible tubers. The tubers are cooked before they are eaten.

References

maculosus edulis
Flora of Ethiopia
Root vegetables
Crops originating from Ethiopia